Roston is a surname. Notable people with the surname include:

Aram Roston, American investigative journalist
Murray Roston (born 1928), Israeli literary scholar
Saulo Roston (born 1989), Brazilian pop singer and songwriter

See also
Raston